Nyack is a village located primarily in the town of Orangetown in Rockland County, New York, United States. Incorporated in 1872, it retains a very small western section in Clarkstown. The village had a population of 7,265 as of the 2020 census.

Setting
Nyack is one of five southeastern Rockland County villages and hamlets that constitute "The Nyacks" – Nyack, Central Nyack, South Nyack, Upper Nyack and West Nyack. Named after the Native Americans who resided there before European colonization, the village consists mostly of low-rise buildings lying on the hilly terrain that meets the western shore of the Hudson River. Adjacent South Nyack is the western terminus of the Tappan Zee Bridge, connected across the Hudson River to Tarrytown in Westchester County by U.S. Interstate 87, an important commuter artery.

It is in the Nyack Public Schools.

History 

Native American stone relics and oyster middens found along the shore of the Hudson indicate today's Nyack was a favorite pre-Colonial fishing spot. The first Europeans settled in there in 1675, calling the general area "Tappan".

Harman Douwenszen is thought to be the first white settler. He came to America as a toddler and grew up in Bergen, New Jersey.  In the State Archives in Albany there is a 1687 letter on file petitioning Governor Dongan to buy a strip of land in the west hills of Tappan (today Nyack), in which he had lived on for 12 years. His petition was granted and he bought the land from the Native Americans. He called his farm New Orania (Oranje in Dutch). This section of Nyack became known as Orangetown in 1683. The Tappan Register of 1707 claimed it was pronounced Nay-ack.  Nyack became part of Rockland County in 1798. Harman's younger brother Theius changed the family name from Douwse (Frisian for first son) to Talma (Dutch for first son). His children became Talman and eventually Tallmans. The New Orania farm became the Tallman homestead, at the northeast corner of what is now Broadway and Tallman Place. The building was demolished in 1914.

Letter dated 31 August 1687 on file at New York State Archives at Albany:
The humble Peticon of Harman Dowse of Tappan Neare Ye River Side, Alias New Orania farm ... your peticonr is a farmer that hath nothing wot comes by his hard labour but by God's Blessing out ye Produce and ye ground, and hath a family to provide for.
On the north wall of the Key Bank building at South Broadway and Burd Street in Nyack is a plaque installed in 1938 that reads:
The Tappan Indians, from time immemorial, occupied these lands fronting the river shore. Here, in summer they lived upon fish and oysters. In Algonkian dialect spoken by them they called this location NAY-ACK which means the fishing place. The first settlement of white people within the limits of the present Rockland County, New York, took place in 1675 when Harmen Dowesen (Tallman), a young Dutchman of Bergen, New Jersey relocated here.

The Tallmans erected a mill upon a stream which still is known as Mill Brook. Abraham Lydecker purchased land from the Tallmans when there were but seven homes in Nyack in 1813. Nyack became an incorporated village in 1872 according to the same plaque on the Midland Trust Building.

Three major industries once thrived in Nyack: sandstone quarrying for New York City buildings (–1840); boat building—sloops, steamboats, then pleasure craft and World War I and II submarine chasers (ca. 1915–1948); and shoe manufacturing (ca. 1828–1900). 

Following the extension of the Northern Railroad of New Jersey into the community in the mid-19th century, rapid growth ensued. Because town government was no longer seen as an effective way to deal with the community's needs, village incorporation was discussed. Fearing higher taxes, those in what would have become the northern part of Nyack village formed their own municipal corporation first, named Upper Nyack. Nyack village was incorporated, although without this northern portion. Residents in the southern part of Nyack village, however, soon became dissatisfied with the notion of paying taxes that more heavily benefited the rest of the village. After succeeding in dissolving Nyack's corporation, the southern portion of the former village incorporated as the village of South Nyack. The area between Upper Nyack and South Nyack was reincorporated thereafter, again as Nyack.

The Nyack Rocklands were a minor league baseball team based in Nyack, New York. The Rocklands were unofficially nicknamed the "Rockies" and played as members of the Class D level North Atlantic League from 1946 to 1948. The Nyack Rocklands were an affiliate of the Philadelphia Athletics in 1947.

Throughout the 18th and 19th centuries, Nyack was known for its shipbuilding and was the commercial center of Rockland County. In the 19th century, a number of factories manufactured shoes. The Erie Railroad connected with Jersey City, New Jersey, where ferries took passengers to Chambers Street, New York City, until it was discontinued in 1966. With the completion of the Tappan Zee Bridge in December 1955, connecting South Nyack with Tarrytown in Westchester County, the population increased and Nyack's commercial sector expanded.

In the 1980s, the village underwent a major urban revitalization project to commercialize the downtown area and to expand its economy. The Helen Hayes Theatre was built, and the downtown area became home to many new business establishments.

In 1991 the landmark court case Stambovsky v. Ackley ruled that a house at 1 LaVeta Place on the Hudson River was legally haunted and that the owner (but not the real estate agent) was required to disclose that to prospective buyers. The owner, Helen Ackley, earlier had organized haunted house tours and was party to an article about it in Reader's Digest.  After Ackley sold the house to another buyer there were no subsequent reports of hauntings.

On August 10, 2010, Highland Hose Company No. 5, a two-story brick firehouse located at 288 Main Street, celebrated 100 years at the firehouse. The firehouse was built in 1910 – fifteen years after Highland Hose was founded. The company's 1949 Ahrens-Fox fire engine was polished to bright, gleaming red and is still in use after more than 50 years.

Geography

Nyack is on the west bank of the Hudson River, north of the Tappan Zee Bridge. The village is also home to Hook Mountain and has hilly terrain, especially along the shore of the river.

Demographics

As of the census of 2000, there were 6,737 people, 3,188 households,
and 1,511 families residing in the village. The population density was 8,749.1
people per square mile (3,378.1/km2). There were 3,288 housing units at an average
density of 4,270.0 per square mile (1,648.7/km2). The racial makeup of the village was
63.8% White, 26.3% African American, 0.2% Native American, 2.4% Asian, 2.7% from other races, and 4.6% from two or more races. Hispanic or Latino of any race
were 8.6% of the population.

There were 3,188 households, out of which 20.5% had children under the age of 18 living with them, 32.0% were married couples living together, 12.3% had a female householder with no husband present, and 52.6% were non-families. 42.3% of all households were made up of individuals, and 12.3% had someone living alone who was 65 years of age or older. The average household size was 2.10 and the average family size was 2.93.

In the village, the population was spread out, with 19.0% under the age of 18, 6.6% from 18 to 24, 36.2% from 25 to 44, 24.8% from 45 to 64, and 13.5% who were 65 years of age or older. The median age was 38 years. For every 100 females, there were 86.7 males. For every 100 females age 18 and over, there were 84.2 males.

The median income for a household in the village was $54,890, and the median income for a family was $69,146. Men had a median income of $50,043 versus $35,202 for women. The per capita income for the village was $32,699. About 2.2% of families and 6.0% of the population were below the poverty line, including 6.3% of those under age 18 and 8.6% of those age 65 or over.

Transportation

Roads 
Nyack is located along the New York State Thruway, in its concurrent section with Interstate 87 and Interstate 287, just to the north of the Tappan Zee Bridge, now officially named the Governor Mario M. Cuomo Bridge. Other important arterial roadways include U.S. Route 9W and New York State Route 59.

Rail 

Nyack was formerly served by the Northern Branch of the Erie Railroad, with service to Pavonia Terminal in Jersey City. (The southern terminus was shifted to Hoboken in 1958 and the Erie Lackawanna operated the train after 1960.) Passenger service was discontinued in 1966, and the rail line has been converted into a walking path. As a result, Nyack no longer has direct passenger rail service. The nearest railroad stations with current passenger service are Tarrytown 8 miles away and Nanuet 5.8 miles away.

Bus 
Nyack is served by the Lower Hudson Transit Link (known colloquially as Hudson Link), which connects Nyack with rail stations in Tarrytown and White Plains. The bus station is located adjacent to the municipal parking lot on Artopee Way. Nyack is also served by Rockland Coaches 9T buses to the Port Authority Bus Terminal and 9A buses to the George Washington Bridge Bus Terminal in New York City. The Rockland Coaches main bus stop is located at the intersection of South Broadway and Cedar Hill Avenue. A secondary stop is located at the intersection of Midland Avenue and Castle Heights Avenue. Local bus transit is provided by Transport of Rockland.

Vessels
USS Nyack

Landmarks and places of interest
Edward Hopper House Art Center – 82 North Broadway – This home of the realist painter Edward Hopper was built in 1858. One room is devoted to materials about Hopper's work and life in Nyack. Three other rooms provide space for monthly exhibits by local artists. The restored garden is the setting for jazz concerts on summer evenings. (NRHP)
First Methodist Episcopal Church of Nyack 1812–1813 (NRHP)
John Green House – Main Street – Built in 1817 by John Green of local sandstone, now covered with stucco, painted yellow. This is the oldest house standing in Nyack. Green started the first lumber yard in Nyack and later opened a store. House is a private residence.
Memorial Park, a short walk from downtown, has a children's playground, a cement skateboard park, tennis courts, a basketball court and a butterfly garden. Canoes and kayaks can be launched from the shores of the park into the Hudson River. Memorial Park hosts many special events including weekly music concerts in the summer, numerous festivals and outdoor movies.
Nyack Library – 59 South Broadway - the 1903 Carnegie Library building.
Nyack Post Office – 48 South Broadway - The 1932 building is a rare example of an American post office constructed between the world wars in the Classical Revival architectural style. The post office is located on South Broadway in the center of the village. It serves the 10960 ZIP code, which covers South Nyack and Upper Nyack in addition to the village. The building was listed on the National Register of Historic Places in 1988. (NRHP)
Nyack-Tarrytown Ferry – foot of Main Street – begun 1834 by Isaac S. Blauvelt on a vessel named Donkey, an Anglo corruption of Dutch dank je, or "thank you". The ferry remained in service until the opening of the Tappan Zee Bridge in the 1950s. This spot was also the start of the Nyack Turnpike, the first direct highway across Rockland County.
Oak Hill Cemetery – 140 N. Highland Avenue (Rte. 9W) – since 1840. Dedicated on June 27, 1848, it reflected a change from small family and religious burial grounds to community cemeteries. Graves include founders of Nyack, playwright Charles MacArthur and his wife, actress Helen Hayes, scientist and inventor William Hand, and artist Edward Hopper.
Pickwick Bookshop - 8 S. Broadway. A local bookstore open in the village since 1945. Sells old classics and new bestsellers.
Red Cross Center – 143 North Broadway. A cross gable Queen Anne building, it was built by Julia and Garret Blauvelt, a physician, surgeon and director of Nyack Hospital, in 1882 and given to the Red Cross in 1915.  During World War I, World War II and the Korean War, the center was a hub for food and blood drives, gathering of clothes and supplies for shipment overseas. Helen Hayes, who lived nearby, was chairwomen of the war fund drive during World War II. Camp Shanks, one of the military's major wartime staging areas, relied heavily on the Red Cross volunteers and services.  Today the center continues to provide clothing, food and shelter in times necessity and emergencies. The center has also provided certification courses in first aid and lifesaving skills since 9/11.
River Rowing Association (RRA) – In 1881, Julian O. Davidson, a local artist and marine painter, founded the Nyack Rowing Association (NRA), which was dedicated to the sport of sculling (two-oared rowing).  The grand boat house, built in 1882 was designed by William Smith and built in the Stick style architecture found in many river homes in the village.
Riverspace Arts in Nyack – 119 Main Street. Home of the Rockland Symphony Orchestra
St. Paul's United Methodist Church – 134 South Broadway, South Nyack - A Romanesque Revival church built in 1894. (NRHP)
Tappan Zee Playhouse – 20 South Broadway – (NRHP) It was demolished in April 2004.
Pretty Penny — 235 North Broadway — A Victorian river home that was formerly owned by American actress Helen Hayes and comedian Rosie O'Donnell

Historical markers

First Milestone from Nyack, Route 59 and Mountainview Avenue, Central Nyack
Couch Court, 46 South Broadway
Edward Hopper House Art Center, 82 North Broadway
First Reformed Church, 18 South Broadway
Historic Underground Railroad, 298 Main Street
Historic Underground Railroad, 176 Main Street
Memorial Park, Piermont and DePew Avenues
Liberty Street School, Cornerstone Placement, Depew Avenue near Liberty Street
Nyack First Settlement, 17 South Broadway
Nyack Library, 59 South Broadway
Oak Hill Cemetery, 140 North Highland Avenue
 "Pretty Penny," 235 North Broadway

Education
Nyack Public Schools serves Nyack. Nyack High School is the village's high school. Nyack was also home to Nyack College, a Christian liberal arts college and one of the four colleges in the United States affiliated with the Christian and Missionary Alliance church.

 Nyack Public Schools
 In 2018, ranked 68 Best School Districts in Nyack by Niche's.
In 2021, Nyack Schools changed their mascot from the Indians to the Redhawks.

The Roman Catholic Archdiocese of New York operates Catholic schools in Rockland County. St. Ann Parish School in Nyack closed in 2003. staffed by the Sisters of St. Dominic.

Notable people

Joseph Alessi, classical trombonist
Caroline Lexow Babcock,  suffragist and pacifist
Stephen Baldwin, actor
Thomas Berger, novelist
Coheed and Cambria, rock band formed in 1995 in Nyack
Joseph Cornell, artist and sculptor
Welles Crowther, an equities trader and 9/11 hero
John Francis Daley, actor, musician, writer, and director
Dorothy Delay, violinist and teacher
Aaron T. Demarest, carriage manufacturer
Jonathan Demme, Director
Terrence Fede, Miami Dolphins defensive end
Wilson P. Foss Jr., art collector and businessman
Ryan Grant, NFL running back
Bill Gunn, playwright, novelist, actor, and film director 
Helen Hayes, actress
Matt Hennessy, NFL center for the Atlanta Falcons
Edward Hopper, painter
Michael E. Horowitz, United States Inspector General
Joe Humeres, professional skateboarder
Sakina Jaffrey, film and television actress
Zita Johann, actress
Van Johnson, actor
Mondaire Jones, first openly gay Black congressman
Mike Kellin, actor
Joseph A. Komonchak, Roman Catholic priest and theologian
Chuck Loeb, jazz musician
George Marshall, conservationist
Charles MacArthur, playwright
James MacArthur, actor
Devin McCourty, New England Patriots starting safety
Jason McCourty, Miami Dolphins starting cornerback
Carson McCullers, author
Toni Morrison, author
Rosie O'Donnell, talk show host and actress
Jansen Panettiere, actor and artist
Regret the Hour, Indie rock band 
Norman Rose, stage, television, and film actor
Charles Samuels, writer and journalist
Michael S. Schmidt, journalist
Jim Shooter, comic book writer and former EIC for Marvel comics
Fabrizio Sotti, jazz guitarist and music producer
Glynis Sweeny, cartoonist
* Sub Urban (born 1999), singer, songwriter and producer
Henry D. Todd, U.S. Navy rear admiral
Robert Ward, composer
Sarah Weeks, author

See also
Brink's robbery (1981)

References

External links

 Historical Markers and War Memorials in Nyack, New York
 Village of Nyack official website
 Nyack Chamber of Commerce
 VisitNyack.org

Populated places established in 1675
New York (state) populated places on the Hudson River
Villages in New York (state)
Villages in Rockland County, New York
1675 establishments in the Province of New York